Royal Air Force Calveley or more simply RAF Calveley is a former Royal Air Force station located near Nantwich, Cheshire.

History
In December 1940, it was decided to build an airfield near the village of Wardle, Cheshire, north-west of Nantwich, as one of a number of airfields intended to boost the fighter defence of Merseyside.

By the time the airfield was complete, the need for fighter defences for the North-West of England had declined, so it was decided to use it for training, with the station opening as a Relief Landing Ground for No. 5 Service Training Flying School (SFTS) based at RAF Ternhill in Shropshire on 14 March 1942. 5 STFS was renamed No. 5 (Pilot) Advanced Flying Unit ((P)AFU) on 13 April 1942, continuing operations both from Ternhill and its satellites, including Calveley, which was the only one of Ternhill's satellites to have hard runways. In May 1943 RAF Calveley became the main base for No. 17 (P)AFU, equipped with 174 Miles Master trainers, which moved from RAF Watton in Norfolk. To accommodate the unit's large number of aircraft, RAF Wrexham served as a satellite airfield.

17 (P)AFU disbanded on 1 February 1944, as part of a shuffle of training units which saw No. 11 (P)AFU, equipped with 132 Airspeed Oxfords, move from RAF Shawbury, freeing the well equipped Shawbury for the Vickers Wellingtons of the Central Navigation School to move from RAF Cranage.

Posted units and aircraft
 From 13 Mar 1942 until May 1943 No. 5 (Pilot) Advanced Flying Unit used the airfield as a Relief Landing Ground from their main airfield at RAF Ternhill flying Miles Masters.
 No 11 (Pilot) Advanced Flying Unit from May 1943 using RAF Wrexham as a satellite.
 From May 1943 until 1 Feb 1944 No 17 (Pilot) AFU moved from RAF Watton and RAF Bodney using RAF Wrexham as a satellite  flying the Airspeed Oxford and Avro Anson then using Harvards Hawker Hurricanes and Miles Masters
 21 Jun 1945 until Oct 1945 - No 5 Aircrew Holding Unit.
 22 Oct 1945 until May 1946 - No 22 Service Flying Training School flying Harvards moved to RAF Ouston.

Current use

The airfield is now farmland and part of an industrial estate.

References

Citations

Bibliography

External links
 Midlands Heritage
 Air of Authority - A History of RAF Organisation
 Facebook Community Group Commemorating the history of RAF Calveley

Earth stations in England
Royal Air Force stations in Cheshire
Science and technology in Cheshire
1942 establishments in England